Aleksandr Vasilyevich Derepovsky (born 10 August 1962) is a Russian football manager and a former player.

Derepovsky played in the Russian First Division with FC Irtysh Omsk and FC Rubin Kazan.

External links
 

1962 births
Sportspeople from Omsk
Living people
Soviet footballers
FC Irtysh Omsk players
Russian footballers
FC Rubin Kazan players
Russian football managers
Association football forwards